This is a list of notable Philippine-based choirs, orchestras and musical bands. Bands listed fall under any of these main Philippine music styles: Philippine folk, Manila sound, Pinoy reggae, Pinoy pop, Pinoy rock and Pinoy hip hop, as well as the jazz and ska music genres.

Choirs
Adventist University of the Philippines Ambassadors
Alicia Bamboo Ensemble
Boscorale
Bukas Palad Music Ministry
Bukidnon State University Chorale
Central Philippine University Bahandi Singers
Chinese Friends of the Jesuit
Chorus Paulinus
Chorus Philippines
De La Salle Zobel Chorale
Hangad
Imusicapella
Las Piñas Boys Choir
Mabuhay Singers
Mapua Cardinal Singers
PLM Rondalla
Polytechnic University of the Philippines Laboratory High School Chorale
San Miguel Master Chorale
Saringhimig Singers
The HiMiG Gospel Singers
Tiples de Santo Domingo
University of the East Chorale
University of the Philippines Concert Chorus
University of the Philippines Madrigal Singers
University of the Philippines Manila Chorale
University of the Philippines Singing Ambassadors
University of Santo Tomas Singers
Vox Angeli Children's Choir

Folk
Asin (folk rock)
Humanfolk

Hip hop

Crazy as Pinoy
Death Threat
Ex Battalion
Q-York
Salbakuta

Jazz
Johnny Alegre Affinity
Sinosikat? (jazz funk)
Sound

Manila sound
APO Hiking Society
Boyfriends
Cinderella
Hagibis
Hotdog
VST & Company
Juan de la Cruz Band

Orchestras
ABS-CBN Philharmonic Orchestra
De La Salle Zobel Symphony Orchestra
FILharmoniKA
Manila Philharmonic Orchestra
Manila Symphony Orchestra
Philippine Philharmonic Orchestra
San Miguel Foundation for the Performing Arts
San Miguel Philharmonic Orchestra

Parody
Kamote Club

Pop

17:28
1:43
1st.One
3LOGY
3rd Avenue
4th Impact
Alamat
April Boys
BGYO
BINI
Ben&Ben
Boyband PH
Down to Mars
Dv8
Eurasia
Freestyle
Gimme 5
Introvoys
Kitty Girls
KAIA
Krissy & Ericka
La Diva
Maasinhon Trio
MNL48
Mocha Girls
MYMP
Neocolours
Nexxus
Press Hit Play
Pop Girls
Reycard Duet
SB19
SexBomb Girls
Side A
Smokey Mountain
South Border
Sugarcane
Sugarpop
The Company
Top One Project
TNT Boys
Viva Hot Babes
XLR8

Reggae

Brownman Revival
Chocolate Factory
Grin Department
Junior Kilat
The Chongkeys
Tropical Depression

Rock

6cyclemind
Aegis
AfterImage 
Alamid
Ang Bandang Shirley
Apartel
Arcadia
Autotelic
Bamboo
Barbie's Cradle
Bethany
Bojo
Brisom
Callalily
Cambio
Cheats
Chicosci
Cover Me Quick!
Cueshé
Curbside
Dead Ends
Death By Stereo
December Avenue
Dominion
Dicta License
Eevee
Eraserheads
Firefly
Franco
General Luna
Greyhoundz
Hale
Hastang
Hey Moonshine
Hilera
Hungry Young Poets
Imago
Introvoys
Itchyworms
IV of Spades
Jensen and The Flips
Juan Karlos
Juan de la Cruz Band
Join the Club
Kala
Kapatid
Kamikazee
Kampon
Kjwan
Lokomotiv
Mayonnaise
MilesExperience
Missing Filemon
Mojofly
Moonstar88
Narda
Neocolours
Nuklus
Oh, Flamingo!
Orange and Lemons
Paramita
Parokya ni Edgar
Pedicab
Plethora
P.O.T.
Prettier Than Pink
Pupil
Radioactive Sago Project 
Razorback 
Rivermaya
Rizal Underground
Rocksteddy
Sandwich
Save Me Hollywood
Session Road 
Shampoo Ni Lola
Shamrock
She's Only Sixteen
Siakol
Silent Sanctuary
Slapshock
Sponge Cola
Stonefree
SUD
Sugarfree
Suitcase101
Taken by Cars
Tanya Markova
Teeth
The Bloomfields
The Camerawalls
The Dawn
The Hi-Jacks
The Jerks
The Juans
The Oktaves
The Pin-Ups
The Ransom Collective
The Youth 
This Band
Throw
TOI
Tom's Story
Top Junk
True Faith
Turbo Goth
Typecast
Unica
Up Dharma Down
Urbandub
Voice of Tranquility
Wolfgang
Yano
Zelle
Zoo

Ska

Put3ska

See also
Pinoy pop
Pinoy hip hop
Pinoy reggae
Ska
Manila sound
Music in the Philippines

References

 

Filipino musical groups
Lists of bands